Mary J. Blige & Friends is a compilation album by American recording artist Mary J. Blige. Released on October 31, 2006 it was sold exclusively in Circuit City stores, and includes tracks featuring guest artists such as Sting, Robin Thicke, and Nas. Also included was a bonus DVD that included a brief career biography, excerpts and behind the scenes views of some of her music videos, interviews with collaborators, and live performances of "Can't Hide from Luv", "Family Affair", and "No More Drama".

Track listing

Charts

References 

2006 compilation albums
Mary J. Blige albums
Geffen Records compilation albums
Albums produced by Robin Thicke